"Glycomyces tritici" is a bacterium from the genus of Glycomyces which has been isolated from rhizospheric soil from a wheat-plant (Triticum aestivum).

References 

Actinomycetia
Bacteria described in 2018